The Geneva Declaration on Armed Violence and Development highlights the role that states and civil society must play in preventing and reducing violence associated with war, crime, and social unrest. The Declaration was adopted on 7 June 2006 and is now endorsed by 113 states. It is the strongest political statement to date that addresses the impact of armed violence within a development context. Regular high-level diplomatic regional meetings and ministerial review conferences take place to assess progress concerning the process and implementation of the Geneva Declaration; the first two ministerial review conferences took place in 2008 and 2011. During 2014 a series of Regional Review Conferences have been organized not only to review the process in implementing the Geneva Declaration but also to reflect and gather support in integrating meaningfully armed violence reduction in national and international development processes, including the post-2015 development agenda.

Overview
By signing the Geneva Declaration states commit to:

 Support initiatives to measure the human, social and economic costs of armed violence;
 Undertake assessments to understand and respond to risks and vulnerabilities;
 Evaluate the effectiveness of armed violence prevention and reduction programs around the world; and
 To disseminate lessons and best practices.

Understanding that the fight against the global scourge of armed violence and the prospects for sustainable development are closely linked, the signatories recognize that armed violence constitutes a major obstacle to the achievement of the Millennium Development Goals. They agree to strengthen their efforts to integrate armed violence reduction and conflict prevention programs into national, regional, and multilateral development frameworks and strategies.

The approach is based on three pillars:

 Advocacy: dissemination and coordination initiatives for implementing the Geneva Declaration
 Measurability: country based armed violence mapping and monitoring to identify entry-points and opportunities for interventions
 Programming: practical programming on armed violence prevention and reduction

A Core Group of 14 signatory states and affiliated organizations is responsible for steering the process and guiding the implementation of the Geneva Declaration. Affiliated organizations include the Bureau for Crisis Prevention and Recovery (BCPR) of the United Nations Development Programme (UNDP), the Small Arms Survey—which also hosts the Geneva Declaration Secretariat—, the Development Assistance Committee (DAC) of the Organisation for Economic Co-operation and Development (OECD), and the Quaker United Nations Office (QUNO).

Core group member states:

 Brazil
 Colombia
 Finland
 Guatemala

 Indonesia
 Kenya
 Morocco
 The Netherlands

 Norway
 The Philippines
 Spain

 Switzerland (coordinating country)
 Thailand
 United Kingdom

Signatory states:

 Afghanistan (2006)
 Albania (2008)
 Angola (2007)
 Argentina (2007)
 Australia (2006)
 Austria (2006)
 Bangladesh (2008)
 Belgium (2011)
 Benin (2007)
 Bosnia and Herzegovina (2006)
 Brazil (2006)
 Brunei (2008)
 Bulgaria (2006)
 Burkina Faso (2007)
 Burundi (2007)
 Canada (2006)
 Cameroon (2007)
 Chad (2014)
 Chile (2006)
 Colombia (2008)
 Congo, Democratic Republic of the (2007)
 Costa Rica (2006)
 Côte d'Ivoire (2007)
 Croatia (2008)
 Cyprus (2009)
 Denmark (2008)
 Dominican Republic (2007)
 Ecuador (2007)
 El Salvador (2006)

 Ethiopia (2007)
 Fiji (2008)
 Finland (2006)
 France (2006)
 Georgia (2008)
 Germany (2006)
 Ghana (2006)
 Greece (2006)
 Guatemala (2006)
 Guinea (2011)
 Guyana (2008)
 Holy See (2006)
 Honduras (2006)
 Hungary (2006)
 Iceland (2007)
 Indonesia (2006)
 Ireland (2006)
 Italy (2007)
 Jamaica (2006)
 Japan (2006)
 Jordan (2006)
 Kazakhstan (2008)
 Kenya (2006)
 Korea, North (2008)
 Korea, South (2006)
 Kyrgyzstan (2008)
 Lebanon (2006)
 Lesotho (2007)

 Liberia (2006)
 Libya (2007)
 Liechtenstein (2008)
 Lithuania (2009)
 Luxembourg (2009)
 Macedonia, Republic of (2009)
 Madagascar (2007)
 Malawi (2007)
 Malaysia (2008)
 Mali (2006)
 Mauritius (2007)
 Mexico (2006)
 Mongolia (2008)
 Montenegro (2008)
 Morocco (2006)
 Mozambique (2006)
 Nauru (2008)
 Nepal (2008)
 Netherlands (2006)
 New Zealand (2006)
 Nicaragua (2009)
 Niger (2007)
 Nigeria (2006)
 Norway (2006)
 Palau (2008)
 Panama (2007)
 Papua New Guinea (2006)
 Peru (2007)

 Philippines (2008)
 Portugal (2006)
 Qatar (2006)
 Romania (2008)
 Rwanda (2007)
 Samoa (2008)
 Senegal (2006)
 Serbia (2008)
 Sierra Leone (2006)
 Slovakia (2008)
 Slovenia (2006)
 Solomon Islands (2008)
 South Africa (2006)
 Spain (2007)
 Sudan (2007)
 Sweden (2006)
 Switzerland (2006)
 Tajikistan (2008)
 Thailand (2006)
 Timor-Leste (2006)
 Togo (2011)
 Uganda (2007)
 United Arab Emirates (2011)
 United Kingdom (2006)
 Uzbekistan (2008)
 Vanuatu (2008)
 Zambia (2007)
 Zimbabwe (2007)

See also
 Armed violence reduction
 Small Arms Survey
 Insecurity Insight

References

External links 
 http://www.genevadeclaration.org
 The full text of the Geneva Declaration
 The Global Burden of Armed Violence
 Research Notes on Reducing Armed Violence, Enabling Development (2012)
 Working Paper on Working Against Violence: Promising Practices in Armed Violence Reduction and Prevention (2011)

Nonviolence
Treaties concluded in 2006
International development treaties
2006 in Switzerland
Treaties of Afghanistan
Treaties of Albania
Treaties of Angola
Treaties of Argentina
Treaties of Australia
Treaties of Austria
Treaties of Bangladesh
Treaties of Belgium
Treaties of Benin
Treaties of Bosnia and Herzegovina
Treaties of Brazil
Treaties of Brunei
Treaties of Bulgaria
Treaties of Burkina Faso
Treaties of Canada
Treaties of Cameroon
Treaties of Chile
Treaties of Colombia
Treaties of the Democratic Republic of the Congo
Treaties of Costa Rica
Treaties of Ivory Coast
Treaties of Croatia
Treaties of Cyprus
Treaties of Denmark
Treaties of the Dominican Republic
Treaties of Ecuador
Treaties of El Salvador
Treaties of Ethiopia
Treaties of Fiji
Treaties of Finland
Treaties of France
Treaties of Georgia (country)
Treaties of Germany
Treaties of Ghana
Treaties of Greece
Treaties of Guatemala
Treaties of Guinea
Treaties of Guyana
Treaties of the Holy See
Treaties of Honduras
Treaties of Hungary
Treaties of Iceland
Treaties of Indonesia
Treaties of Ireland
Treaties of Italy
Treaties of Jamaica
Treaties of Japan
Treaties of Jordan
Treaties of Kazakhstan
Treaties of Kenya
Treaties of North Korea
Treaties of South Korea
Treaties of Kyrgyzstan
Treaties of Lebanon
Treaties of Lesotho
Treaties of Liberia
Treaties of the Libyan Arab Jamahiriya
Treaties of Liechtenstein
Treaties of Lithuania
Treaties of Luxembourg
Treaties of North Macedonia
Treaties of Madagascar
Treaties of Malawi
Treaties of Malaysia
Treaties of Mali
Treaties of Mauritius
Treaties of Mexico
Treaties of Mongolia
Treaties of Montenegro
Treaties of Morocco
Treaties of Mozambique
Treaties of Nauru
Treaties of Nepal
Treaties of the Netherlands
Treaties of New Zealand
Treaties of Nicaragua
Treaties of Niger
Treaties of Nigeria
Treaties of Norway
Treaties of Palau
Treaties of Panama
Treaties of Papua New Guinea
Treaties of Peru
Treaties of the Philippines
Treaties of Portugal
Treaties of Qatar
Treaties of Romania
Treaties of Rwanda
Treaties of Samoa
Treaties of Senegal
Treaties of Serbia
Treaties of Sierra Leone
Treaties of Slovakia
Treaties of Slovenia
Treaties of the Solomon Islands
Treaties of South Africa
Treaties of Spain
Treaties of the Republic of the Sudan (1985–2011)
Treaties of Sweden
Treaties of Switzerland
Treaties of Tajikistan
Treaties of Thailand
Treaties of East Timor
Treaties of Togo
Treaties of Uganda
Treaties of the United Arab Emirates
Treaties of the United Kingdom
Treaties of Uzbekistan
Treaties of Vanuatu
Treaties of Zambia
Treaties of Zimbabwe